Jump Salty is a compilation album by the American punk rock band Pinhead Gunpowder. The album collects tracks from the group's first two extended plays, Tründle and Spring and Fahizah, as well as compilation appearances.

After the compilation's release, guitarist Sarah Kirsch (billed as Mike Kirsch) left the band and was replaced by Jason White.

Jump Salty was re-released on CD (and for the first time on vinyl) by Recess Records on February 12, 2010. In April 30, 2021 the album was reissued again by 1-2-3-4 Go! Records

Track listing

Personnel
 Aaron Cometbus – drums
 Billie Joe Armstrong – guitar, vocals
 Sarah Kirsch (billed as Mike Kirsch) – guitar, vocals
 Bill Schneider – bass, backing vocals

Production
 Kevin Army - production
 John Golden - mastering
 Aaron Cometbus - cover art, graphic design
 Bill Schneider - photography

References

Pinhead Gunpowder albums
1994 debut albums
Lookout! Records albums